Kyle Smith (born 1966) is an American critic, columnist and novelist. After fifteen years of writing for National Review, most recently as critic-at-large, Smith announced on July 15, 2022 in his "Farewell" post that he was leaving to become the film critic for The Wall Street Journal.  He continues as theater critic for The New Criterion. Earlier, he was a film critic for the New York Post, and a contributor to The Wall Street Journal, People,  New York, Forbes, The New York Times, and Commentary.

Education
Smith graduated from East Longmeadow High School in East Longmeadow, Massachusetts in 1984 and from Yale University, summa cum laude, as an English major, and as a Phi Beta Kappa member. Smith served in the U.S. Army during the Persian Gulf War, holding the rank of lieutenant. From 1996 to 2005 he worked at People magazine as editor of book and music reviews.

Writing 
A writer in Entertainment Weekly described Smith's film-reviewing style as "an exercise in hilarious hostility". He has been dubbed "America's most cantankerous film critic" by The Atlantic.

Love Monkey 
Love Monkey was published by William Morrow in 2004. Times critic Janet Maslin called the book "hilarious". Time magazine said, "You couldn't ask for a more entertaining drinking buddy – watch out for a memorable strip-club meltdown scene – but there's a deep, dark subway of despair running underneath his riffs, and that's what makes the book more than a standup routine... Love Monkey nails it."

On January 17, 2006, a one-hour CBS TV series based on the book debuted; it was a dramedy also called Love Monkey. It starred Tom Cavanagh, Judy Greer, Jason Priestley and Larenz Tate. The show aired on CBS in January–February 2006, but was pulled from the CBS prime-time schedule after only three episodes had been aired. Shortly afterwards, VH1 announced that it had acquired the rights to broadcast all 8 episodes which had been filmed to that point. They aired on VH1 in April and May 2006.

A Christmas Caroline 
Smith's second novel, A Christmas Caroline, was published in 2006, also by William Morrow. The Wall Street Journal critic Joseph Bottum wrote, "For those who prefer their sentimentality seasoned with a dash of cynical wit, Kyle Smith's A Christmas Caroline may be a good selection. Mr. Smith ... turns in a quick, enjoyable read about a selfish woman at a fashion magazine who is taught the true meaning of Christmas by three spooky visitors. From the moment you meet Caroline's assistant—a devious redhead named Ursula Heep—you know you're at play in the fields of Charles Dickens.... Mr. Smith takes Dickens' old, familiar tale and stuffs it into a woman straight out of The Devil Wears Prada".

References

External links
 Archive of Kyle Smith's pieces at National Review
 Archive of Kyle Smith's pieces at The New Criterion

1966 births
20th-century American male writers
21st-century American male writers
21st-century American non-fiction writers
National Review people
21st-century American novelists
American film critics
American magazine editors
American male non-fiction writers
American male novelists
Living people
Military personnel from Massachusetts
Novelists from Massachusetts
People from East Longmeadow, Massachusetts
United States Army officers
United States Army personnel of the Gulf War
Yale University alumni